The masque Comus, or There in the Blissful Shades (HWV * 44) is a short version of John Milton's Comus, based on a libretto earlier made by John Dalton for composer Thomas Arne's own Comus. The sixty-year-old Handel composed the setting in 1745 for the pleasure of other guests during his summer recuperation at the country seat of the Earl of Gainsborough. Some of the music was later recycled by Handel, for example as the tenor aria Then will I Jehovah's praise from the Occasional Oratorio.

Recordings
 Alceste & Comus. AAM, Christopher Hogwood. L'Oiseau-Lyre.

References

Compositions by George Frideric Handel
1745 operas